Norma Giménez (June 11, 1930 – September 21, 1957) was an Argentine stage and film actress.

By 1957, Giménez had appeared in 24 films. At the age of 27 she committed suicide by throwing herself under a train. The reasons for killing herself are unclear, although she was possibly distressed because her lover Juan Carlos Barbieri had left her for another woman, the actress Inés Moreno.

Selected filmography
 From Man to Man (1949)
 Valentina (1950)
 Don't Ever Open That Door (1952)
 Spring of Life (1957)

References

Bibliography 
 Insaurralde, Andrés. Manuel Romero. Centro Editor de América Latina, 1994.

External links 
 

1930 births
1957 deaths
Argentine film actresses
20th-century Argentine actresses
1957 suicides
Suicides by train
Suicides in Argentina